Piano Sonata No. 16 may refer to: 
Piano Sonata No. 16 (Beethoven)
Piano Sonata No. 16 (Mozart)